Taastrup Teater is a theatre in Taastrup in the western suburbs of Copenhagen, Denmark.

History
Taastrup Theatre was founded by a group of local residents in 1970. It received its current name and engaged an artistic director in 1987. The repertoire was also changed.

Building
The theatre is based in a community centre from the 1970s which was expanded several times during the 1990s.

COBE was expanded the theatre with a new foyer. It consists of a curtain that slope away from the existing building. It consists of translucent and clear acrylic  triangles which are illuminated by red lights from within when the theatre is sold out.

References

External links
 Official website

Theatres in Copenhagen
Buildings and structures in Høje-Taastrup Municipality